The Filipino American Museum (abbreviated FAM) was a roving museum in New York City that features programming related to Filipino American arts, music and culture.

History
Founded in October 2013 in New York City, the museum aims to support “contemporary Filipino-American arts and the roots and traditions of the Philippine diaspora.”

See also
Filipinos in the New York metropolitan area
List of museums and cultural institutions in New York City

References

Filipino-American culture in New York City
2013 establishments in New York City

Defunct museums in New York City